The 1954 Arizona State Sun Devils football team was an American football team that represented Arizona State College (later renamed Arizona State University) in the Border Conference during the 1954 college football season. In their third and final season under head coach Clyde B. Smith, the Sun Devils compiled an 5–5 record (3–1 against Border opponents) and were outscored by their opponents by a combined total of 178 to 228.

Schedule

References

Arizona State
Arizona State Sun Devils football seasons
Arizona State Sun Devils football